Khola is a small town in Bolivia.

See also
 Khola Gaon, is a village in Bangladesh
 Khola gotra

References

Populated places in La Paz Department (Bolivia)